The John H. Dillon Medal is a medal that has been awarded annually by the American Physical Society (APS) since 1983. The recipients are  young polymer physicists chosen for "outstanding accomplishment and unusual promise in research in polymer physics" One medal is awarded each year to a nominee who received their terminal degree (e.g. PhD) less than 12 years prior to nomination. The award consists of a $2,000 prize, and $1000 allowance for traveling to the APS March Meeting to present their work, and receive the medal. The award is sponsored by Elsevier.

Recipients

See also 

 List of physics awards
List of prizes named after people

References 

Awards of the American Physical Society
Dillion, John, Medal
1983 establishments in the United States
Fellows of the American Physical Society